The John Elder Professor of Naval Architecture and Ocean Engineering at the University of Glasgow, in Scotland, was founded in 1883 and endowed by Isabella Elder (1828-1905) in memory of her husband, John Elder, marine engineer and shipbuilder of Randolph, Elder & Co., (1824-1869).

John Elder Professors of Naval Architecture and Ocean Engineering 
 Francis Elgar LLD (1883)
 Philip Jenkins (1886)
 Sir John Harvard Biles DSc LLD (1891)
 Percy Archibald Hillhouse DSc (1921-1942)
 Andrew McCance Robb DSc LLD (1944)
 John Farquhar Christie Conn DSc (1957)
 Douglas Faulkner BSc PhD RCNC FEng (1973)
 Nigel D P Barltrop BSc CEng SICE MRINA

See also
List of Professorships at the University of Glasgow

References
Who, What and Where: The History and Constitution of the University of Glasgow compiled by Michael Moss, Moira Rankin and Lesley Richmond

Elder Professor of Naval Architecture and Ocean Engineering, Glasgow
1883 establishments in Scotland
Naval architecture
Marine engineering